This is a list of equipment of the Norwegian Army currently in service and on order.

Note: This list is indicative only, as strict comparisons cannot accurately be made.

Individual and crew served weapons

Pistols

Submachine guns

Assault rifles

Marksman rifles & Sniper rifles

Machine guns

Grenade launchers

Anti-tank and anti-aircraft weapons

Armoured vehicles

Armoured recovery vehicle

Armoured engineering vehicle

Artillery

Mortar carrier

Infantry crew served mortar

Air defence system

General-purpose vehicles

Unmanned aerial vehicles/Surveillance unmanned aerial vehicles

Medical

Other equipment

References 

Military equipment of Norway
Norwegian Army
Equipment